John Mulvihill (born 1 July 1945) is a former Irish Labour Party politician. He was a Teachta Dála (TD) for Cork East from 1992 to 1997.

A plant operator, Mulvihill was elected to Dáil Éireann for Cork East during the swing to Labour at the 1992 general election.

Like some other Labour TDs elected in 1992, he lost his seat at the 1997 general election. His seat was taken by David Stanton of Fine Gael. Mulvihill again unsuccessfully contested the 2002, 2007 and 2011 general elections.

He was a local councillor for the Midleton local electoral area on Cork County Council from 1991 to 2014. His son John Mulvihill, Jnr was a member of Cobh Town Council and a former Mayor of Cobh.

References

External links
John Mulvihill's page on the Labour party website

 

1945 births
Living people
Local councillors in County Cork
Labour Party (Ireland) TDs
Members of the 27th Dáil